"The Wallet" is the 45th episode of the sitcom Seinfeld. It is the fifth episode of the fourth season of the series, and first aired on September 23, 1992. In this episode Morty's wallet goes missing from his trousers while at a back specialist's office, Jerry tries to conceal his having thrown away the watch Morty gave him, and George turns down his and Jerry's deal for a television pilot.

Plot
Jerry's parents Morty and Helen Seinfeld come to town from Florida to see a back pain specialist. They ask Jerry about the watch they gave him. To cover up his having thrown it away, Jerry claims it will be in the repair shop for a week.

George turns down his and Jerry's deal for a television pilot show with NBC, hoping NBC will offer them more money to get them to sign. Susan Ross and Jerry explain to George that the proffered deal is standard for first-time creators and that if they turn it down NBC will just buy a pilot from someone else, but he does not believe them. Susan also gives George a box of smuggled Cuban cigars as a gift from her father, but smoking them makes him nauseous, so he gives them to Kramer. Kramer repeatedly lights himself on fire while smoking them.

While Morty is being examined at the doctor's office his wallet is stolen from his trousers, so he storms out without getting diagnosis or treatment. At dinner with Uncle Leo, Leo shows them his watch, the one they gave Jerry, telling them he found it in the garbage and got it repaired in one day.

Elaine returns to town from her trip. She has been trying to end her relationship with her boyfriend, but he uses his position as her psychiatrist to convince her that breaking up with him would be unhealthy for her. She tries claiming that she has started a sexual relationship with Kramer, but he demands that Kramer contact him.

"The Wallet" is part 1 of a two-part story which concludes in "The Watch".

Production
This was the first episode in the fourth season to include Elaine in a major role. Julia Louis-Dreyfus was pregnant for part of the third season and was absent in "The Trip" and only had cameo appearances in "The Pitch" and "The Ticket". The plot line of her in Europe and the men in California was to accommodate her absence.

Series continuity
The wallet was later revealed to be in Jerry's couch in "The Pilot, Part 2".

The box of cigars given to George by Susan's father, which George in turn gives to Kramer, is the same box of cigars that burns down the cabin in "The Bubble Boy". The story of the cigars continues on and is a central part of the story in "The Cheever Letters".

References

External links

Seinfeld (season 4) episodes
1992 American television episodes
Television episodes written by Larry David